The 2005 Triple J Hottest 100 was announced on 26 January 2006. It was the thirteenth such countdown of the most popular songs of the year, according to listeners of the Australian radio station Triple J.

The broadcast began at 10am AEDT and finished a little before 7pm when the top song was announced.   Broadcast live from the Sydney Big Day Out from 12pm AEDT, it regularly crossed to winning artists and listeners around Australia, with many listening to the broadcast as part of their Australia Day celebrations.

Voters were limited to 20 votes each – 10 via SMS (charged at 30c per message) and 10 via the Internet (at no charge).

Wolfmother had the most entries in the countdown with six, the most by an artist in a single countdown. Their record has not been surpassed since and was not equalled until the 2022 countdown 17 years later, by Spacey Jane.

Full list 
Note: Australian artists 

50 of the 100 tracks are by Australian artists (marked with a green background).

Artists with multiple entries
Six entries
Wolfmother (84, 39, 37, 16, 9, 6)
Four entries
Bloc Party (88, 45, 40, 23)
The Cat Empire (100, 54, 38, 25)
Three entries
Ben Lee (86, 53, 2)
Gorillaz (41, 5, 3)
The White Stripes (67, 17, 7)
Franz Ferdinand (93, 90, 10)
System of a Down (76, 57, 27)
Missy Higgins (74, 47, 31)
Two entries
Bernard Fanning (14, 1)
Foo Fighters (20, 4)
Butterfingers (69, 11)
Sarah Blasko (65, 15)
The Herd (87, 18)
Kisschasy (95, 22)
Coldplay (36, 26)
Kaiser Chiefs (34, 28)
Gyroscope (62, 29)
After The Fall (78, 30)
Cog (71, 32)
Beck (75, 35)
Emiliana Torrini (91, 44)
Ben Folds (89, 55)
The Dandy Warhols (82, 60)
Clare Bowditch (94, 63)
Jack Johnson (73, 64)

Top 10 Albums of 2005
Bold indicates winner of the Hottest 100. Wolfmother won the J Award for their self-titled album.

CD release
The 2-CD set titled triple j – Hottest 100: Vol 13 Various Artists was released in 2006. It is a compilation of 41 of the top 100 songs.

External links
Triple J Hottest 100

References

2005 in Australian music
Australia Triple J
2005